The 2022 Connecticut State Comptroller election took place on November 8, 2022, to elect the next Connecticut State Comptroller. Incumbent Democrat Natalie Braswell was appointed to the position by Governor Ned Lamont after the resignation of Kevin Lembo. She did not seek a full term.

Democratic primary

Candidates

Declared
Sean Scanlon, state representative (2015–present)

Declined
Natalie Braswell, incumbent comptroller

Endorsements

Republican primary

Candidates

Declared
Mary Fay, member of the West Hartford town council

Endorsements

Results

References

External links
Mary Fay (R) for Comptroller

2022 Connecticut elections